Oymakaya  is a village in the Beytüşşebap District of Şırnak Province in Turkey. The village is populated by Kurds of the Kaşuran tribe and had a population of 814 in 2021.

The hamlets of Dutlu, Karlıca, Taşarası and Üçyol are attached to Boğazören.

References 

Villages in Beytüşşebap District
Kurdish settlements in Şırnak Province